The Pearl River Valley Railroad  was a shortline railroad that ran from Nicholson to Picayune, Mississippi. It began operation in 1917 and was abandoned in 2007.

External links 

http://hawkinsrails.net/shortlines/prv/prv.htm
http://www.msrailroads.com/PRV.htm

Defunct Mississippi railroads